David Kenny is the CEO of Nielsen Holdings. He joined Nielsen in December 2018, prior to which he was the senior Vice President of IBM's Watson & Cloud platform. He was also formerly the CEO of The Weather Company, which was acquired by IBM in 2016. Kenny replaced Mike Kelly at the Weather Company in January 2012. He was also the chairman of the board.

He was the president of Akamai Technologies and resigned from this position on October 26, 2011. Before joining Akamai, Kenny worked in digital advertising for Publicis Groupe S.A.’s VivaKi.

He graduated from Kettering University and Harvard Business School.

References

Year of birth missing (living people)
Living people
Directors of Yahoo!
American corporate directors
American chief executives in the media industry
American chairpersons of corporations
Publicis Groupe
The Weather Channel people
Kettering University alumni
Harvard Business School alumni